Alessandra Pescosta (born 16 May 1973) is an Italian snowboarder. 

She was born in Bolzano. She competed at the 1998 Winter Olympics, in halfpipe, and also at the 2002 Winter Olympics.

References

External links 
 

1973 births
Living people
Italian female snowboarders
Olympic snowboarders of Italy
Snowboarders at the 1998 Winter Olympics
Snowboarders at the 2002 Winter Olympics
Sportspeople from Bolzano